is a Japanese film director. He directed Premonition, Dream Cruise, and Orochi: Blood.

Career
Tsuruta directed Dream Cruise for the Masters of Horror Showtime cable network series. It is based on the short story of the same name by Koji Suzuki.

He also directed Orochi: Blood, which is based on the manga by Kazuo Umezu.

Filmography

Film
 Toneriko (1985)
 Scary True Stories: Ten Haunting Tales from the Japanese Underground (1991)
 Scary True Stories: Night 2 (1992)
 Scary True Stories: Realm of Spectres  (1992)
 Gotoshi Kabusikigaisha (1993)
 Gotoshi Kabusikigaisha 2 (1994)
 Ring 0: Birthday (2000)
 Kakashi (2001)
 Premonition (2004)
 Orochi: Blood (2008)
 Ōsama Game (2011)
 POV: Norowareta Film (2012)
 Talk to the Dead (2013)
 Z ~Zed~ (2014)

Television
 Sky High (2003)
 Dream Cruise (2007)
 ? (series) (2012-2015)

References

External links
 
 
 

Japanese film directors
Horror film directors
1960 births
Living people
People from Tokyo